Maurennea is a genus of air-breathing land snails, terrestrial pulmonate gastropod mollusks in the family Streptaxidae.

Distribution 
The distribution of the genus Maurennea includes:
 Mauritius
 Comoros?

Species
Species within the genus Maurennea include:

References

Streptaxidae